Street to Nowhere was an indie/alternative rock band from Oakland, California.

History
Since its birth, Street to Nowhere has gone through many changes. Founded in 2001 by Singer/Songwriter Dave Smallen, Bassist/Backing Vocals Spenser Russell-Snyder and Drummer Stefan Litrownik, the band began as a pop-punk trio and ended up becoming one of the mainstays of the L3 concert series in Oakland . During 2002 the band recorded The Oakland EP and a number of demos, but after high school, the original members of the band went their separate ways, leaving Dave Smallen without a band.

This, however, did not stop him from playing shows; still using the name Street to Nowhere, he continued to play solo acoustic shows, including Live 105's Battle of the Bands in 2004, which won him a spot on the local stage at Live 105's BFD that year. Since then Street to Nowhere has shared the stage with bands such as The Format, Gomez, Jack's Mannequin, Two Gallants, OK GO, Maxeen, Reel Big Fish, The Matches, and in 2007 returned to the BFD local stage as headliners.

Street to Nowhere has since re-filled the vacancies in the band with drummer Joey Bustos (Link 80)/(Desa), lead guitarist Will Hauser, and bassist Bryce Freeman. On occasion Street to Nowhere is joined on stage by violinist Anton Patzner of Judgement Day, Audrye Sessions, and Bright Eyes.

In November 2005, Street to Nowhere released their first full-length album, Charmingly Awkward, at a sold out show at San Francisco's Bottom of the Hill. The album was a bit of a collaborative project with other members of Bay Area bands (including Desa, The Matches, and Push To Talk) who provided vocals for the drunken hollering and singing at the end of the song Tipsy. Anton Patzner (Audrye Sessions, Judgement Day, Bright Eyes) plays the violin in the songs Screamin', Boxcars Boxcars and You Can't Go to Sleep.

They released a 7" EP in July 2006 through Agent Records featuring the songs "Hallelujah" (a cover of Leonard Cohen's original) and "It's Not Me".

Street to Nowhere was signed to Capitol Records in June 2006.

In 2008, singer/guitarist Dave Smallen announced that Street to Nowhere had been disbanded, and he would now perform under his own name.  Since then, Dave has released several albums through his website and iTunes.

Tours and festivals
 June 2004 - Opener on Live 105's BFD's local stage
 June 2006 - Headliner on BFD's local stage
 Summer 2006 - Street to Nowhere's First nationwide tour, opening for The Format.
 September 2006 - Austin City Limits Festival
 Fall 2006 - Touring the east coast with Lostprophets

For more up-to-date touring information visit the group's  Myspace Page

Discography
Vinyl 7" (2006)  Agent Records
Charmingly Awkward (2005) Re-released in August 2006 on Capitol Records
Agent Records Presents The NorCal Compilation 2004 (2004)
Agent Records Presents The NorCal Compilation 2003 (2003)
The Oakland EP (2002)

External links
 Official Street to Nowhere website
 Dave Smallen official website
 Street to Nowhere on Myspace
 Street to Nowhere on PureVolume
 Street to Nowhere's Fan/Street Team Myspace (message or follow instructions from the normal Myspace blog to be added, or sign up on their mailing list for the "secret" lastname)

Alternative rock groups from California
Indie rock musical groups from California
Musical groups from Oakland, California